Mister Organ is a 2022 New Zealand documentary film by David Farrier, focusing on the life of Michael Organ, an enigmatic figure associated with an antiques store and car clamping business in Ponsonby, Auckland, and Farrier's attempts to learn more about his life.

Synopsis

The documentary investigates Michael Organ, beginning with an investigation into Bashford Antiques, an antique store in Ponsonby, Auckland which was known for its over-enthusiastic car clamping policy. The documentary follows Organ's past victims, his response to Farrier's organisation, and the psychological warfare techniques he uses against Farrier.

Production 
The film is a result of a three-year investigation. Farrier first reported on the story of Bashford Antiques in September 2016, in an article for The Spinoff. As a result of Farrier's original story, the New Zealand Government introduced legislation outlawing excessive clamping fees. 

The film was announced by Farrier in his blog in June 2020, originally with the title Clamped. Farrier described the documentary's production as a difficult ordeal, stating that:

Release 

The film debuted on 12 October 2022 at Fantastic Fest, an annual film festival held in Austin, Texas. It was released to New Zealand cinemas on 10 November.

Reception
The film received positive reviews. It holds  on Rotten Tomatoes based on  critic reviews.

Legal disputes
After Bashford Antiques closed, Farrier took the store's broken and abandoned sign, which led Organ to take Farrier to the Whanganui Disputes Tribunal, in order to repossess the sign. Since the sign had gone missing, Farrier was forced to pay NZ$3,000 in compensation to Organ.

In late October 2022, broadcaster and The Platform founder Sean Plunket shared several legal documents on Twitter relating to a temporary restraining order issued against Farrier ahead of Mister Organ release in November. On 5 November, Farrier subsequently confirmed during a media interview with Radio New Zealand host Kim Hill that the legal documents were genuine. On 8 November, Farrier announced during an interview with Tova O'Brien on Today FM that he would be pursuing legal action against Plunket over his Tweets and the dissemination of the protection order.

References

External links
 
 

2022 films
2022 documentary films
2020s New Zealand films
2020s English-language films
New Zealand documentary films
Films set in New Zealand
Films shot in New Zealand